Mykola Volodymyrovych Rogozhynsky was a self-nominated candidate in the 2004 Ukrainian presidential election. He chaired the Center for Juvenile Creativity, "Zvezdopad" also spelled "Zorepad" ("Starfall"), where more than 100 children aged from 5 to 18 study for free. Rogozhynsky was also a poet, his collection "If I could.." was nominated for the 2003 Nobel Prize for Literature. When vying for the 2004 election, he promised to switch the Ukrainian economy to an innovative development model by development of hi-tech sector, modernization of science and education, investment in intellectual and labor potential of a human being. He also promised to turn companies that comprise the geostrategic potential of Ukraine into joint-stock companies with a majority ownership by state.

In the first round of the election he polled 10,242 votes, 0.03% of the total, and was eliminated from the second round.

References

Year of birth missing (living people)
Living people
Candidates in the 2004 Ukrainian presidential election